Perth High School is a six-year, non-denominational comprehensive secondary school in Perth, Scotland. Established in 1950 at Gowans Terrace in a post-war prefabricated structure of a type that had not previously been used for any large school in Scotland. The school relocated to its present location in 1971, two years after the opening in 1969 of the adjacent Oakbank Primary School. It stands in extensive grounds occupying a position on a hill overlooking Oakbank Road and Viewlands Road West.

School building
The building consists of a complex centred on a four-storey main teaching block. The school gives particular emphasis to environmental issues and the grounds contain a number of specialised environmental project areas. In 2019, the school's proposal for a new building went through, and construction will begin in 2023.

Notable former pupils

Ann Gloag, business woman and charity campaigner, the founder of Stagecoach
Eve Graham, lead singer of The New Seekers
Jo Wilson, television presenter
Rory Skinner, motorcycle racer
Liam Gordon, footballer

References

External links

Perth High School's page on Scottish Schools Online

Secondary schools in Perth and Kinross
Schools in Perth, Scotland
1950 establishments in Scotland
Educational institutions established in 1950